Daliyetemishi (died 1368) was an empress consort of the Yuan dynasty of China, married to Rinchinbal Khan (Emperor Ningzong).

Notes

Year of birth missing
Yuan dynasty empresses
1368 deaths
14th-century Mongolian women
14th-century Chinese women
14th-century Chinese people